Sari Tappeh (also Romanized as Sārī Tappeh; also known as Sardaba, Sardābeh, Sari Tepe, and Sar Tappeh) is a village in Dowlatabad Rural District, in the Central District of Marand County, East Azerbaijan Province, Iran. At the 2006 census, its population was 461, in 126 families.

References 

Populated places in Marand County